Angustalius philippiellus  is a moth of the Crambinae family described by Pierre Viette in 1970. It is known from northern Madagascar.

It has a wingspan of 32–33 mm with a length of the forewings of 16.5–17 mm.

References

Crambinae
Moths of Madagascar
Moths of Africa